Shards of Space is a collection of science fiction short stories by American writer Robert Sheckley. It was first published in 1962 by Bantam Books.

Contents
The collection includes the following stories (magazines in which the stories originally appeared given in parentheses):

 "Prospector's Special" (Galaxy, December 1959)
 "The Girls and Nugent Miller" (The Magazine of Fantasy & Science Fiction, March 1960)
 "Meeting of the Minds" (Galaxy, February 1960)
 "Potential" (Astounding SF,  November 1953)
 "Fool's Mate" (Astounding SF, March 1953)
 "Subsistence Level" (Galaxy, August 1954, under the pseudonym Finn O'Donnevan)
 "The Slow Season" (F&SF, October 1954)
 "Alone at Last" (Infinity Science Fiction, February 1957)
 "Forever" (Galaxy, February 1959, under the pseudonym Ned Lang)
 "The Sweeper of Loray" (Galaxy, April 1959)
 "The Special Exhibit" (Esquire,  October 1953)

Reception
The Hartford Courant reviewed the collection favorably, describing Sheckley as "one of the best in the science-fantasy field."

References

External links

1962 short story collections
Short story collections by Robert Sheckley
American short story collections